Bulldog Drummond's Revenge is a 1937 American adventure mystery film directed by Louis King, produced by Stuart Walker, written by Edward T. Lowe Jr. and Herman C. McNeile (novel), and featuring John Barrymore. The picture stars John Howard in his second appearance as Bulldog Drummond; Howard previously appeared as Ronald Colman's (who had made the first talkie Bulldog Drummond)   brother in Lost Horizon.  Top-billed John Barrymore portrays his friend Colonel Nielsen.

Plot
The film tells the story of Captain Hugh "Bulldog" Drummond (John Howard), a British officer who, while on a drive with his friend Algy Longworth (Reginald Denny) and valet Tenny (E.E. Clive), is the first to discover a mysterious suitcase that is parachuted from an aircraft above, minutes before the plane crashes. The case is found to contain the highly explosive chemical hexanite, the plans for which have been stolen. Despite the urging of his fiancee Phyllis Claverling, Drummond is dragged into the mystery surrounding the whole affair, traveling by both train and ship to recover the formula.

Cast
 John Barrymore as Col. J.A. Nielson
 John Howard as Capt. Hugh Chesterton 'Bulldog' Drummond
 Louise Campbell as Phyllis Clavering
 Reginald Denny as Algy Longworth
 E.E. Clive as "Tenny" Tennison
 Frank Puglia as Draven Nogais
 Nydia Westman as Gwen Longworth
 Robert Gleckler as Hardcastle
 Lucien Littlefield as Mr. Smith
 John Sutton as Jennings, Nielson's Secretary
 Miki Morita as Sumio Kanda
 Benny Bartlett as Cabin Boy
 Matthew Boulton as Sir John Haxton

Soundtrack

References

External links
 
 
 
 
 

Films based on Bulldog Drummond
1937 films
American mystery films
1930s English-language films
American black-and-white films
Paramount Pictures films
1930s adventure films
Films directed by Louis King
1930s crime films
Rail transport films
American adventure films
American thriller films
1930s American films